Frankfurt Sarsfields is a Frankfurt based Gaelic football team. The team competes in European wide tournaments and have been Shield runners-up in their first two seasons.
 
The aim of the club is to give Gaelic football players in Germany a chance to show their talents while also giving people in Hessen, Rhineland-Palatinate and the surrounding regions a chance to play this exciting and skilful game.

The Club is an amateur organisation that welcomes all those who wish to play or get involved with the team.

External links
 Frankfurt Sarfielsd Website

Gaelic football clubs in Germany
Sport in Frankfurt